Blood for Mercy is the first studio album by Dutch electronic music ensemble Yellow Claw.

Track listing 
Roller (featuring Eyelar)
Higher (featuring Lil Eddie)
For the Thrill (featuring Becky G)
Nightmare (featuring Pusha T & Barrington Levy)
In My Room (with Mustard featuring Ty Dolla $ign & Tyga)
Lifetime (featuring Kyler England & Tiësto)
Catch Me (with Flux Pavilion featuring Naaz)
We Made It (featuring Lil Eddie)
Feel It (featuring Naaz)
Drowning in Champagne (featuring Maty Noyes)
Blood Diamond (featuring Serebro)
Sin City
Bun It Up (featuring Beenie Man)
Wild Mustang (with Cesqeaux featuring Becky G)
Ride or Die (with Dirtcaps featuring Kalibwoy)
Kaolo, Pt. 3

Remix album
Roller (featuring Eyelar) [The Galaxy Remix]
Higher (featuring Lil Eddie) [Cesqeaux Remix]
For the Thrill (featuring Becky G) [LNY TNZ Remix]
Nightmare (featuring Pusha T & Barrington Levy) [Ape Drums Remix]
In My Room (with DJ Mustard featuring Ty Dolla $ign & Tyga) [Midas Hutch Remix]
Lifetime (featuring Kyler England & Tiësto) [Victor Niglio Remix]
Catch Me (with Flux Pavilion featuring Naaz) [Candlelight Remix]
We Made It (featuring Lil Eddie) [Snavs Remix]
Feel It (featuring Naaz) [Moksi Remix]
Drowning in Champagne (featuring Maty Noyes) [Chace Remix]
Blood Diamond (featuring Serebro) [Zeskullz Remix]
Sin City [Rain Man Remix]
Bun It Up (featuring Beenie Man) [Moth Circuit Remix]
Wild Mustang (with Cesqeaux featuring Becky G) [Mike Cervello Remix]
Ride or Die (with Dirtcaps featuring Kalibwoy) [Modestep Remix]
Kaolo, Pt. 3 [Mightyfools Remix]
In My Room (with DJ Mustard featuring Ty Dolla $ign & Tyga) San Holo Remix]

Chart history

References 

2015 debut albums
Yellow Claw (DJs) albums
Mad Decent albums